Thomas Alfred Spencer (1 December 1860 - 10 June 1937) was a member of the Queensland Legislative Assembly.

Biography
Spencer was born at Barraba, New South Wales, the son of Charles Spencer, a Church of England clergyman and rector of Roma, and his wife Susan (née Dowling). He was educated at Roma State School and also received private tuition. He was the part-owner or owner of Redford, Dalmally, Foyle View and Morocco South stations.

In 1898 he married Lily McPherson Gordon (died 1957) in Sydney and together had two sons and one daughter. Spencer died in Sydney in June 1937 as a result of an automobile accident which occurred several days earlier. His funeral proceeded from St Mark's Church of England, Darling Point to the Rookwood Cemetery.

Public career
Spencer represented the seat of Maranoa in the Queensland Legislative Assembly on two separate occasions. The first was from the 1904 state election, where as a member of the Ministerialists he defeated his Labour opponent. He was defeated three years later in 1907 by John Hunter.

The second time he held Maranoa was at the by-election in 1919 to replace the previous member, John Hunter, who had resigned from the seat to take up the role of agent-general for Queensland in England. He was once again defeated, this time by Labor's Charles Conroy at the state election held less than a year later.

References

Members of the Queensland Legislative Assembly
1860 births
1937 deaths
Road incident deaths in New South Wales